The 1966–67 Duke Blue Devils men's basketball team represented Duke University in the 1966–67 NCAA University Division men's basketball season. The head coach was Vic Bubas and the team finished the season with an overall record of 18–9 and did not qualify for the NCAA tournament.

Having played on the freshman team the previous year, the 1966–67 season was the first season for C. B. Claiborne, the first African-American to integrate the Duke basketball team. He made his first start in a January 1967 victory over Penn State, after head coach Vic Bubas suspended nine of his players.

Roster

Compiled from multiple sources

References

External links
 Season statistics at Sports Reference
 Season statistics at NCAA Statistics

Duke Blue Devils men's basketball seasons
Duke
Duke
1966 in sports in North Carolina
1967 in sports in North Carolina